Zarrin Dasht is a district (bakhsh) in Nahavand County, Hamadan Province, Iran. At the 2006 census, its population was 14,435, in 3,625 families.  The District has one city: Barzul. The District has two rural districts (dehestan): Fazl Rural District and Garin Rural District.

References 

Nahavand County
Districts of Hamadan Province